Justin Gimelstob and Sébastien Lareau were the defending champions but only Gimelstob competed that year with Jared Palmer.

Gimelstob and Palmer lost in the second round to Tommy Haas and Glenn Weiner.

Bob Bryan and Mike Bryan won in the final 6–3, 7–6(7–3) against Alex O'Brien and Jonathan Stark.

Seeds
All eight seeded teams received byes to the second round.

Draw

Final

Top half

Bottom half

External links
 ATP draw

2001 Kroger St. Jude International
Doubles